The Flammenwerfer 41, or FmW 41 (literally, "flame thrower") was the standard German flamethrower beginning in 1941 and an upgraded version of the earlier Flammenwerfer 35, whose main issue was its excessive weight of 36kg, with the Flammenwerfer 41 being only 18. It performed a similar role of other flamethrowers of the time, namely clearing enemy trenches and buildings in highly fortified areas. From 1942 to April 1945, 64,284 examples were produced. After 1945, flamethrowers gradually saw less usage, and the Bundeswehr does not use any.

Similar to many other designs of the time, the FmW 41 used a hydrogen torch to ignite a tar and petrol mixture which was fired from a hand-held torch attached to a tank. The petrol and propellant were carried in separate tanks carried on the back which held 11.8 litres (2.6 imp gal; 3.1 US gal) of tar and petrol mixture called Flammöl 19. The 
FmW 41 proved to be more reliable and easier to operate than its predecessor, it had an increased range of 32 metres (105 ft).  and was lighter weighing in at 28.7 kilograms (63 lb).

Problems surfaced against Soviet troops during the winter of 1941 as its lighting mechanism was unable to cope with the cold weather conditions. Later versions of the weapon replaced the hydrogen torch with a cartridge based system which proved more effective.

See also 

List of flamethrowers

References 

World War II infantry weapons of Germany
Flamethrowers
Weapons and ammunition introduced in 1941